In mathematics, the term permutation representation of a (typically finite) group  can refer to either of two closely related notions: a representation of  as a group of permutations, or as a group of permutation matrices. The term also refers to the combination of the two.

Abstract permutation representation

 

See the article on group action for further details.

Linear permutation representation

which maps  to the corresponding permutation matrix (here  is an arbitrary field).

This notion of a permutation representation can, of course, be composed with the previous one to represent an arbitrary abstract group  as a group of permutation matrices. One first represents  as a permutation group and then maps each permutation to the corresponding matrix. Representing  as a permutation group acting on itself by translation, one obtains the regular representation.

Character of the permutation representation

Now the character of this representation is defined as the trace of this permutation matrix.

So 
 as only 3 is fixed

References

Representation theory of finite groups
Permutation groups

External links 
https://mathoverflow.net/questions/286393/how-do-i-know-if-an-irreducible-representation-is-a-permutation-representation